Elections to Leeds City Council were held on 4 May 1978, with one third of the council up for election, as well as an extra vacancy in Wetherby. Prior to the election, the Hunslet East and West incumbent, Dennis Peddar, had defected from the Liberals to Independent, and fought this election as such.

The election seen a returning swing to Labour, although gains and losses were spread fairly equitably, with Labour narrowly gaining from the Conservatives in Wortley and comfortably from the Independent in Hunslet East and West, but losing Burmantofts and Richmond Hill to the Liberals. The Conservative gain from the Liberals in Pudsey South left the two parties' totals unchanged. This resulted in the Conservatives retaining control of the council, with an unaltered majority of four.

Election result

This result has the following consequences for the total number of seats on the council after the elections:

Ward results

References

1978 English local elections
1978
1970s in Leeds